Dylan is a male given name and surname of Welsh origin. It means "son of the sea” or "born from the ocean". Dylan ail Don was a character in Welsh mythology, but the popularity of Dylan as a given name in modern times arises from the poet Dylan Thomas. In Wales, it was the most popular Welsh name given to boys in 2010. Dylan was among the five most popular names for Hispanic newborn boys in the American state of Virginia in 2022

As a first name it is sometimes spelt Dylann.

People with the given name

Male
Dylan Ainsworth (born 1992), Canadian football player
Dylan Alcott (born 1990), Australian wheelchair tennis & basketball player
Dylan Arnold (born 1994), American actor 
Dylan Axelrod (born 1985), American professional baseball player
Dylan Baker (born 1959), American actor
Dylan Brody (born 1964), American writer
Dylan Brown (born 2000), New Zealand NRL player
Dylan Bruce (born 1980), Canadian actor
Dylan Bundy (born 1992), American baseball player
Dylan Cantrell (born 1994), American football player
Dylan Carlson (baseball) (born 1998), American baseball player
Dylan Cease (born 1995), American baseball player
Dylan Coleman (born 1996), American baseball player
Dylan Cramer (born 1958), Canadian musician
Dylan Disu (born 2000), American basketball player
Dylan Donahue (born 1992), American football player
Dylan Everett (born 1995), Canadian actor
Dylan Floro (born 1990), American baseball player
Dylan Groenewegen (born 1993), Dutch professional road racing cyclist
Dylan Holloway (born 2001), Canadian ice hockey player
Dylan Horton (born 2000), American football player
Dylan Howe (born 1969), English musician
Dylan Klebold (1981–1999), American mass murderer (one of the perpetrators of the Columbine High School massacre)
Dylan Kwasniewski (born 1995), American NASCAR driver
Dylan Larkin (born 1996), American ice hockey player
Dylan Lee (born 1994), American baseball player
Dylan Lewis (born 1973), Australian television and radio personality
Dylan Llewellyn, English actor
Dylan Lupton (born 1993), American racing driver
Dylan Mabin (born 1997), American football player
Dylan McDermott (born 1961), American actor
 Dylan Mills (born 1985), English rapper, known professionally as Dizzee Rascal
Dylan Minnette (born 1996), American actor, singer, and musician 
Dylan Moore (born 1992), American baseball player
Dylan Moran (born 1971), Irish comedian
Dylan Moscovitch (born 1984), Canadian Olympic medalist pair skater
Dylan Moses (born 1998), American football player
Dylan Murnane (born 1995), Australian footballer
Dylan Napa (born 1992), Australian rugby league player
Dylan Neal (born 1969), Canadian actor
Dylan O'Brien (born 1991), American actor and occasional musician 
Dylan Ratigan (born 1972), American television journalist
Dylan Reese (born 1984), American ice hockey player
Dylan River, Australian filmmaker 
Dylann Roof (born 1994), American perpetrator of the Charleston church shooting
Dylan Smith (Australian rules footballer) (born 1982), Australian rules footballer
Dylan Smith (businessman) (born 1985), American businessman
Dylan Riley Snyder (born 1997), American actor, singer, dancer
Dylan Sprayberry (born 1998), American actor
Dylan Sprouse (born 1992), American actor
Dylan Strome (born 1997), Canadian ice hockey player
Dylan Thomas (1914–1953), Welsh poet
Dylan van Baarle (born 1992), Dutch racing cyclist
Dylan Walsh (born 1963), American actor
Dylan Wang (born 1998), Chinese actor (王鶴棣)
Dylan Windler (born 1996), American basketball player
Dylan Wynn (born 1993), American football player
Dylan Williams, multiple people

Female
Dylann Ceriani, American volleyball player
Dylan Dreyer (born 1981), American meteorologist
Dylan Farrow (born 1985), adopted daughter of Mia Farrow
Dylan Gelula (born 1994), American actress
Dylan Lauren (born 1974), American entrepreneur, owner of Dylan's Candy Bar (daughter of Ralph Lauren)
Dylan Mulvaney (born 1996), American actress
Dylan Penn (born 1991), American model and actress (daughter of Sean Penn and Robin Wright)

People with the surname
Bob Dylan (born 1941), American composer and performer (born Robert Zimmerman)
Ellie Dylan (born 1952), American executive
Jakob Dylan (born 1969), American singer-songwriter, lead singer of the rock band The Wallflowers (son of Bob and Sara Dylan)
Jesse Dylan (born 1966), American film director, eldest son of Bob Dylan and Sara Dylan
Sara Dylan (born 1939), American actress, first wife of Bob Dylan
Sarah X Dylan (born 1980), American radio and television personality
Whitney Dylan (born 1976), American television and film actress

Fictional characters
Dylan Ail Don, a Celtic mythological figure in Wales
Dylan, a hippy rabbit in The Magic Roundabout
Dylan Dog, main character of the eponymous comic series
Dylan Sanders, character played by Drew Barrymore in the movie Charlie's Angels (2000 film) and its sequel Charlie's Angels: Full Throttle
Dylan Keogh, a main character in BBC medical drama Casualty, played by Will Beck
Dylan "Dil" Pickles, cartoon character from Rugrats and All Grown Up!
Dylan Marvil, in The Clique series 
Dylan Mayfair, played by Lyndsy Fonseca in Desperate Housewives
Dylan Rhodes, played by Mark Ruffalo in Now You See Me
Dylan McKay, played by Luke Perry on Beverly Hills 90210
Dylan Michalchuk, on the TV series Degrassi: The Next Generation
Dylan Schoenfield, main character of the book Geek Charming by Robin Palmer and its 2011 film adaptation, Geek Charming
Dylan West, a.k.a. Houdini, from the 2006 live-action film Zoom 
One of the characters from 101 Dalmatian Street

Other uses 
See Dylan (disambiguation)

References

English-language masculine given names
English masculine given names
English unisex given names